Rhamphomyia anomalipennis is a species of dance fly, in the fly family Empididae. It is included in the subgenus Megacyttarus of the genus Rhamphomyia.

References

Rhamphomyia
Asilomorph flies of Europe
Insects described in 1822